Aeropus II, son of Perdiccas II, was king of Macedonia from 398/7 until his death from illness in July or August of 394/3 BC. He first governed as guardian (epitropos) for his young nephew Orestes when Archelaus died in 400/399 BC. However, Diodorus reports that Aeropus murdered Orestes three years later, but it is also possible that he had simply won the support of the Macedonian nobility. Aeropus had a son named Pausanias, but was succeeded instead by Amyntas II, son of his great-uncle Menelaus.  

Two traditions relate how Aeropus was overawed by either the insolence or the stratagems of the Lacedaemonian king Agesilaus, allowing his armies free passage through Macedonia after their campaign in Asia.

There is a minority view among scholars that Aeropus was a Lyncestian prince, rather than an Argead, who married into the dynasty, therefore enabling him later to become regent for Orestes. However, the majority of historians believe Aeropus to have been Perdiccas' son and thus a member of the dynasty.

References

Notes

Citations

4th-century BC Macedonian monarchs
4th-century BC rulers
Argead kings of Macedonia